Danny Collins is a 2015 American comedy-drama film written and directed by Dan Fogelman in his feature directorial debut. Inspired by the true story of folk singer Steve Tilston, the film stars Al Pacino, Annette Bening, Jennifer Garner, Bobby Cannavale and Christopher Plummer. The film was released in theaters on March 20, 2015.

For his performance, Pacino was nominated for the Golden Globe Award for Best Actor – Motion Picture Musical or Comedy at the 73rd Golden Globe Awards.

Plot

Aging 1970s rocker Danny Collins cannot give up his hard-living ways – but then his manager, Frank Grubman, uncovers a 40-year-old undelivered letter to him from John Lennon. After reading the letter, Danny decides to change his way of life. He travels to New Jersey to attempt to connect for the first time with his grown son, Tom Donnelly, born from a casual relationship with a woman who died 10 years earlier. Tom has a wife, Samantha, and seven-year-old daughter, Hope, and is expecting a second child.

Seeking a new start, Danny forswears touring and checks into a Hilton hotel in New Jersey, much to the delight of the young staff. He begins to woo the hotel manager, Mary, and tries to set up her assistant Jaime on a date.

Tom initially rejects the father he believes abandoned him, but Danny persists, getting Hope, who has ADHD, into an exclusive school for children with special needs. He learns Tom has what doctors say may be terminal leukemia, inherited from his mother, and begins to attend doctor's visits with him. Tom's dislike of his father gradually gives way to the need for his support.

Inspired by his feelings for Mary and his happiness at having a family, Danny begins to write new songs. He books a one-night performance at a small club. However, when the audience demands he play his old material, Danny loses his nerve and gives a rote performance. Ashamed, he resumes doing drugs, damaging his relationship with Mary and his family. Tom confronts him, causing Danny to angrily reveal Tom's leukemia diagnosis, something Samantha had not been aware of. Feeling betrayed, Tom tells Danny never to bother his family again.

Danny finds out from Frank that his finances are in danger, on account of all his excessive habits, and that he needs to go on tour again. Danny goes to the hotel to mend fences with Mary. Tom is visited by Frank, who tells him that his father, despite many flaws, is a good man. Tom then finds Danny waiting at the doctor's office to hear his diagnosis. Danny reassures him that everything will be all right, which, after the doctor arrives, appears to be the case.

Cast
 Al Pacino as Danny Collins
 Annette Bening as Mary Sinclair
 Jennifer Garner as Samantha Leigh Donnelly
 Bobby Cannavale as Tom Donnelly
 Christopher Plummer as Frank Grubman
 Nick Offerman as Guy DeLoach
 Cesar Evora as Gabriel 
 Josh Peck as Nicky Ernst
 Scott Lawrence as Dr. Kurtz
 Fernando Colunga as Fernando
 Michelle Vieth as Selena
 Katarina Čas as Sophie
 Brian Thomas Smith Judd (Busy Work)
 Melissa Benoist as Jamie
 Giselle Eisenberg as Hope Donnelly
 Eric Michael Roy as Young Danny Collins

Background
The story is based on a real-life situation in which John Lennon and Yoko Ono wrote a letter to the English folk singer Steve Tilston in 1971 but this remained unknown to him for 34 years. The real letter was signed "John + Yoko", while the letter in the movie was signed "John".

Production
In November 2010, Steve Carell was attached to star in the film, then titled Imagine, as the rocker's son, but he ultimately dropped out due to scheduling conflicts. In June 2011, Al Pacino was in discussions to star in the film. In October 2012, Jeremy Renner was announced as Carrell's replacement and Julianne Moore also joined the film. Both were eventually also replaced; by Bobby Cannavale and Annette Bening, respectively.
Filming began in July 2013 in Los Angeles. The crew filmed a scene with Pacino during a concert of the band Chicago in Los Angeles. In November 2014, it was reported that the film had been retitled Danny Collins, and that Ryan Adams would compose the score with Theodore Shapiro. The film also switched distributors from Warner Bros. Pictures to Bleecker Street.

Reception
On Rotten Tomatoes, the film has an approval rating of 78% based on 134 reviews, with an average rating of 6.44/10. The site's critical consensus reads, "Thanks to Al Pacino's stirring central performance — and excellent work from an esteemed supporting cast — Danny Collins manages to overcome its more predictable and heavy-handed moments to deliver a heartfelt tale of redemption." On Metacritic, the film has a score of 58 out of 100, based on 31 critics, indicating "mixed or average reviews".

Entertainment Weekly's Chris Nashawaty named the film one of 2015's "overlooked gems".

In addition to Pacino's Golden Globe Award nomination, two of the film's original songs, "Don't Look Down" and "Hey Baby Doll", were long-listed for the 2015 Academy Award for Best Original Song.

References

External links
 
 
 
 Official screenplay

2015 films
2015 comedy-drama films
2015 directorial debut films
2015 independent films
American comedy-drama films
American independent films
Films about music and musicians
American films based on actual events
Bleecker Street films
Entertainment One films
Films directed by Dan Fogelman
Films scored by Theodore Shapiro
Films set in hotels
Films set in Los Angeles
Films shot in Los Angeles
Films with screenplays by Dan Fogelman
2010s English-language films
2010s American films